Le Testament d'un poète juif assassiné (1980), translated into English as The Testament (1981) is a novel by Elie Wiesel. The Testament, to be followed by The Fifth Son, and The Forgotten mark a thematic change in Elie Wiesel's telling of the Holocaust and its aftermath as Wiesel moves into telling the story of three children of the survivors. The novel takes the form of the memoirs of a Russian Jewish poet, Paltiel Kossova, whose idealism leads him to turn from his Jewish religious heritage towards communism. The novel won the Prix du Livre Inter, and Prix des Bibliothécaires, Prix Interallie 1980 and was nominated for the Prix Concourt.

References

1980 French novels
Novels by Elie Wiesel
Novels set in Romania
French-language novels
Éditions du Seuil books